State tax may refer to:

 Taxes imposed by U.S. states
 State income tax
 State sales tax
 State tax levels in the United States
 Taxes imposed by Indian states
 Taxation in India#State governments
 Taxes imposed by sovereign states
 List of countries by tax rates

See also 

 :Category:State taxation in the United States